The Russia men's national volleyball team is governed by the Russian Volleyball Federation and took part in international volleyball competitions.

FIVB considers Russia as the inheritor of the records of Soviet Union (1948–1991) and CIS (1992).
The USSR Volleyball Federation joined the FIVB in 1948, a year after the foundation of the international governing body. The following year they sent a team to compete in the first FIVB Men’s World Championship and have been dominating the international scene ever since, having won six World Championships, four Olympic Games, six World Cups and 14 European Championships (medals of Russian and the Soviet union combined).

History
The USSR Volleyball Federation joined the FIVB in 1948,0 and the following year they sent a team to compete in the first World Championship.

In response to the 2022 Russian invasion of Ukraine, the International Volleyball Federation suspended all Russian national teams, clubs, and officials, as well as beach and snow volleyball athletes, from all events, and stripped Russia of the right to host the 2022 FIVB Volleyball Men's World Championship in August 2022, and has relocated 2022 FIVB Volleyball Men's Nations League games that were to be in Russia in August and September. The European Volleyball Confederation (CEV) also banned all Russian national teams, clubs, and officials from participating in European competition, and suspended all members of Russia from their respective functions in CEV organs.

Medals

Results

Olympic Games
 Champions   Runners up   Third place   Fourth place

World Championship
 Champions   Runners up   Third place   Fourth place

World Cup
 Champions   Runners up   Third place   Fourth place

World Grand Champions Cup
2013 –  Silver medal

World League
 Champions   Runners up   Third place   Fourth place

Nations League
 Champions   Runners up   Third place   Fourth place

European Championship
 Champions   Runners up   Third place   Fourth place

European League
2004 –  Silver medal
2005 –  Gold medal

Goodwill Games
 Champions   Runners up   Third place   Fourth place

Team

Current squad
The following is the Russian roster in the 2020 Summer Olympics.

Head coach: Tuomas Sammelvuo

Coaches
  Viacheslav Platonov (1996–1997)
  Vyacheslav Zaytsev (1997–1997)
  Gennadiy Shipulin (1998–2004)

  Zoran Gajić (2005–2006)
  Vladimir Alekno (2007–2008)
  Daniele Bagnoli (2009–2010)
  Vladimir Alekno (2011–2012)
  Andrey Voronkov (2013–2015)
  Vladimir Alekno (2015–2016)
  Sergey Shlyapnikov (2017–2019)
  Tuomas Sammelvuo (2019–2022)
 Konstantin Bryanskiy (2022-

Kit providers
The table below shows the history of kit providers for the Russia national volleyball team.

References

External links
Official website
FIVB profile

National men's volleyball teams
M